82 class may refer to:

British Rail Class 82
DB Class 82
KTM Class 82
New South Wales 82 class locomotive